Gasteracantha cancriformis (spinybacked orbweaver) is a species of orb-weaver spider (family Araneidae). It is widely distributed in the New World.

Description

The six abdominal spine-like projections on the abdomen are characteristic. The carapace, legs, and underside are black with white spots under the abdomen. Variations occur in the colour of the upperside of the abdomen - a white or yellow colour with both featuring black spots. A white upper side can have either red or black spines while a yellow upperside can only have black ones. Like with many other spiders, males are much smaller (2 to 3 mm long) and longer than wide. All morphs have six abdominal spines. They are similar to the females in colour, but have a gray abdomen with white spots and the spines are reduced to four or five stubby projections.

This species of spider does not live very long. In fact, the lifespan lasts only until reproduction, which usually takes place in the spring following the winter when they hatched. Females die after producing an egg mass, and males die six days after a complete cycle of sperm induction to the female.

Distribution and habitat
G. cancriformis is native to North America, Central America, the Caribbean and South America. It has been introduced elsewhere, including Hawaii. It prefers living around the edge of woodland and shrubby gardens. Many studies about G. cancriformis are performed in citrus groves in Florida.

G. cancriformis is seen to coexist within and on the edges of the colonies of other colonial orb-weaver spiders, mainly Metepeira incrassata. M. incrassata is known to form large colonies ranging from few hundreds to few thousands of spiders, and their colonies often accommodate other species of orb-weavers including G. cancriformis.

Taxonomy
G. cancriformis has two subspecies, G. c. cancriformis and G. c. gertschi.

Gallery

See also
 Thelacantha brevispina
 Austracantha minax

References

Further reading
 Eberhard, William G. (2006): Stabilimenta of Philoponella vicina (Araneae: Uloboridae) and Gasteracantha cancriformis (Araneae: Araneidae): Evidence Against a Prey Attractant Function. Biotropica 39(2): 216-220.

External links

cancriformis
Spiders of North America
Spiders of South America
Spiders described in 1758
Taxa named by Carl Linnaeus
Articles containing video clips